on3-radio was a German, public radio station owned and operated by the Bayerischer Rundfunk (BR). On April 18, 2013, it was announced and officially confirmed on May 8 that on3-radio would be replaced by a new radio station called PULS on May 15, 2013. The name PULS also acts as a replacement for the previous umbrella brand on3. On May 5, 2008, the station was renamed on3radio.

References

Bayerischer Rundfunk
Defunct radio stations in Germany
Radio stations established in 2008
Radio stations disestablished in 2013
2008 establishments in Germany
2013 disestablishments in Germany
Mass media in Munich